Duncombe Creek is a  long 1st order tributary to the Uwharrie River, in Montgomery County, North Carolina.

Course
Duncombe Creek rises on the Poison Fork divide on the east side of King Mountain in Randolph County, North Carolina.  Duncombe Creek then flows southwest to meet the Uwharrie River about 4 miles south-southeast of Coggins Mine.

Watershed
Duncombe Creek drains  of area, receives about 47.5 in/year of precipitation, has a topographic wetness index of 364.55 and is about 79% forested.

See also
List of rivers of North Carolina

References

Rivers of North Carolina
Rivers of Montgomery County, North Carolina
Rivers of Randolph County, North Carolina